Remixes is a compilation album of remixes, and third overall release, from Latin pop singer Enrique Iglesias. The album was released on 5 May 1998. The album contains a number of remixes of tracks from Iglesias' first two albums, Enrique Iglesias and Vivir. The album was the first of three compilation releases made available by Fonovisa before Iglesias signed a deal with Interscope records in 1999. The album contains the first release of the English-language version of "Sólo En Ti", titled "Only You", which was later re-released on the more commercial release Bailamos Greatest Hits, released in 1999.The album was certified gold in u.s with sales of 500,000 copies.

Track listing

References

Enrique Iglesias remix albums
1998 remix albums
Spanish-language remix albums